Khristo Traykov (born 24 September 1947) is a Bulgarian wrestler. He competed at the 1968 Summer Olympics and the 1972 Summer Olympics.

References

External links
 

1947 births
Living people
Bulgarian male sport wrestlers
Olympic wrestlers of Bulgaria
Wrestlers at the 1968 Summer Olympics
Wrestlers at the 1972 Summer Olympics
Sportspeople from Sofia Province